Joachim Knychała (September 8, 1952 – October 28, 1985) was a Polish serial killer, known as "The Vampire of Bytom" or "Frankenstein", who murdered five women between 1975 and 1982 in the Upper Silesian industrial region. He was apprehended, sentenced to death and hanged.

Victims
The list contains names of the victims of Knychała, place of murder and the date of murder

Elżbieta Mikułowa – Piekary Śląskie; November 1975
Mirosława Sarnowska – Chorzów; May 6, 1976 
Teresa Ryms – Bytom; October 30, 1976 
Halina Syda – Piekary Śląskie; June 23, 1979
Bogusława Ludyga – Piekary Śląskie; May 8, 1982

See also
List of serial killers by country

References

20th-century Polish criminals
1952 births
1975 murders in Poland
1982 murders in Poland
1985 deaths
1970s murders in Poland
1980s murders in Poland
Executed people from Silesian Voivodeship
Executed Polish serial killers
Male serial killers
People convicted of murder by Poland
People executed by Poland by hanging
People executed by the Polish People's Republic
People from Bytom
Polish people convicted of murder
Polish people of German descent

Violence against women in Poland